Peter Davis may refer to:
Peter Hadland Davis (1918–1992), British botanist
Peter George Davis (1923–2011), British Special Boat Service officer
Peter G. Davis (1936–2021), American opera critic and scholar
Peter Davis (director) (born 1937), American news writer and documentary filmmaker
Sir Peter Davis (businessman) (born 1941), British businessman
Peter Davis (sociologist) (born 1947), professor of sociology and husband of former New Zealand Prime Minister Helen Clark
Peter Davis (theater historian), professor at the University of Illinois
Peter Lovell-Davis, Baron Lovell-Davis (1924–2001), British publishing executive and Labour Party politician
Peter Davis (judge), a  judge of the Supreme Court of Queensland, Australia

See also
Peter Davies (disambiguation)
Peter Davis Oakey (1861–1920), U.S. Representative from Connecticut